Rupsi Airport  is a domestic airport serving the city of Dhubri, Assam, India. The airport serves as a way for people of the lower part of Assam to travel to India's major cities and states. The airport also serves as a layover for those traveling to the wildlife parks of Chakrashila Wildlife Sanctuary, Ultapani Reserve Forest and Manas National Park of Assam and Jaldapara National Park in Alipurduar district and Buxa Tiger Reserve of West Bengal.

History 
The Rupsi Airfield was constructed by the British during World War II to supply arms, manpower, and ammunition to the Allied forces. It was used by the United States Army Air Forces' Tenth Air Force in the China-Burma-India Theater. The regional airline, Vayudoot, used to operate services to the airport in the 1980s, but withdrew services after the closure of the airline in 1984, after which the Government of India made unsuccessful attempts to revive the airport with the joint initiative of the Ministry of Civil Aviation and the North Eastern Council (NEC). The World War II era airstrip remained defunct since 1984. The Airports Authority of India (AAI) and the Indian Air Force (IAF) have begun work to revive the airfield since 2010s. Finally, commercial operations to the airport began under the Government's UDAN Scheme in 2021.

The then Chief Minister of Assam, Sarbananda Sonowal, along with Bodoland Territorial Council (BTC) Chief, Hagrama Mohilary, laid the foundation stone of construction of the airport's terminal on 22 February 2019. An estimated cost of Rs. 70 crore was spent to make the airport suitable for the operation of ATR-72 type of aircraft, including the  terminal building. The infrastructure for the airport was made ready by October 2019. The newly launched domestic airline, FlyBig, started operations in the airport on 8 May 2021, by starting flight services to Guwahati and Kolkata. In the future, other destinations from the airport will be covered. On 5 May 2021, FlyBig conducted a successful trial of its flight at the airport. The AAI and IAF will jointly develop the airport for both commercial and military operations.

Facilities
It has one paved runway designated 05/23, which measures .

Airlines and destinations

Statistics

See also
 Dibrugarh Airport
 Lilabari Airport
 Silchar Airport
 Tezpur Airport

References

Airports in Assam
Kokrajhar
Transport in Dhubri
1940s establishments in British India
Military airbases established in the 1940s
20th-century architecture in India